These Four Walls may refer to:

 These Four Walls (Shawn Colvin album), 2006
 These Four Walls (We Were Promised Jetpacks album), 2009
 "These Four Walls", song by Little Mix from the album Salute
 "These Four Walls", song by Irma Thomas written by Lynn Farr, 1970
 "These Four Walls", song by Sara Evans from the album Real Fine Place